The Marinerang Pilipina Lady Skippers are a professional women's volleyball team in the Philippine Super Liga (PSL). The team debuted in the 2019 PSL All-Filipino Conference. It is affiliated with the Marinerong Pilipino Skippers men's basketball team in the PBA D-League.

Due to the COVID-19 pandemic, the 2020 season of the PSL was cancelled. Prior to the beginning of 2021 season, the team, along with two other member teams took an indefinite leave of absence from the league.

Current roster

For the 2020 PSL Grand Prix Conference:

Position main 

The following is the Marinerang Pilipina Lady Skippers roster in the: 2020 PSL Grand Prix Conference

Head coach
  María Vilet Ponce-de León
Assistant coaches
  Ronald Dulay
  Paul John Doloiras
| valign="top" |

Team manager
  Rebecca Gail Montero

Doctor/Therapist
  Rico/Santos/Galvez

Previous roster

Coaching staff
 Head coach: Ronald Dulay
 Assistant coach: María Vilet Ponce-de León

Team staff
 Team Manager:
 Team Utility:

Medical staff
 Team Physician: 
 Physical Therapist:

Honors

Team captains
  Ivy Remulla (2019 - 2020)

References

2019 establishments in the Philippines
Volleyball clubs established in 2019
Philippine Super Liga
Women's volleyball teams in the Philippines